Sir Max Edgar Lucien Mallowan  (6 May 1904 – 19 August 1978) was a prominent British archaeologist, specialising in ancient Middle Eastern history. He was the second husband of Dame Agatha Christie.

Life and work
Born Edgar Mallowan in Wandsworth on 6 May 1904, he was the son of Frederick Mallowan and his wife Marguerite (née Duvivier), whose mother was mezzo-soprano Marthe Duvivier.
His father's family was from Austria. He was educated at Rokeby School and Lancing College (where he was a contemporary of Evelyn Waugh) and studied classics at New College, Oxford.

He first worked as an apprentice to Leonard Woolley at the archaeological site of Ur (1925–1930), which was thought to be the capital of Mesopotamian civilization. It was at the Ur site, in 1930, that he first met Agatha Christie, the famous author, whom he married the same year. In 1932, after a short time working at Nineveh with Reginald Campbell Thompson, Mallowan became a field director for a series of expeditions jointly run by the British Museum and the British School of Archaeology in Iraq. His excavations included the prehistoric village at Tell Arpachiyah, and the sites at Chagar Bazar and Tell Brak in the Upper Khabur area (Syria). He was also the first to excavate archaeological sites in the Balikh Valley, to the west of the Khabur basin.

Following the outbreak of the Second World War he served with the Royal Air Force Volunteer Reserve in North Africa, being based for part of 1943 at the ancient city of Sabratha in Libya. He was commissioned as a pilot officer on probation in the Administrative and Special Duties Branch on 11 February 1941, promoted flying officer on 18 August 1941, flight lieutenant on 1 April 1943 and at some point he also held the rank of wing commander. He resigned his commission on 10 February 1954, but was permitted to retain that rank in retirement.

After the war, in 1947, he was appointed Professor of Western Asiatic Archaeology at the University of London, a position which he held until elected a fellow of All Souls College, Oxford in 1962. In 1947, he also became director of the British School of Archaeology in Iraq (1947–1961) and directed the resumption of its work at Nimrud (previously excavated by A. H. Layard), which he published in Nimrud and its Remains (2 volumes, 1966). Mallowan gave an account of his work in Twenty-five Years of Mesopotamian Discovery (1956) and his wife Agatha Christie described his work in Syria in Come, Tell Me How You Live (1946).

Max's first wife, Lady Mallowan, known to millions as Agatha Christie, died in 1976; the following year, Mallowan married Barbara Hastings Parker, an archaeologist, who had been his epigraphist at Nimrud and Secretary of the British School of Archaeology in Iraq.

Honours
Mallowan was appointed Commander of the Order of the British Empire in the 1960 Queen's Birthday Honours, and knighted in 1968. He gave the 1969 Albert Reckitt Archaeological Lecture. He and Dame Agatha Christie were among a number of married couples each of whom held knightly honours in their own right.

Death
He died on 19 August 1978, aged 74, at Greenway House in Devon and was interred alongside his first wife, Dame Agatha, in the churchyard of St Mary's, Cholsey in Oxfordshire. His estate was valued at £524,054. His widow Barbara, the second Lady Mallowan, died in Wallingford in 1993, at the age of 85.

In popular culture 
In 2019, Mallowan was portrayed by Jonah Hauer-King in the film Agatha and the Curse of Ishtar.

In 2022, Mallowan was portrayed by Lucian Msamati in the British-American film See How They Run.

Selected works

See also
 Nimrud ivories

References

Further reading
 Cameron, George G. "Sir Max Mallowan, 1904–1978: [Obituary]", The Biblical Archaeologist, Vol. 42, No. 3. (Summer, 1979), pp. 180–183.
 Christie Mallowan, Agatha. Come, Tell Me How You Live: An Archaeological Memoir. New York: Dodd, Mead and Company, 1976 (hardcover); New York: Vintage/Ebury, 1983 (hardcover); New York: HarperCollins, 1999 (paperback); Pleasantville, NY: Akadine Press, 2002 (with introduction by David Pryce-Jones; paperback).
 Mallowan, M.E.L. Mallowan's Memoirs. New York: Dodd, Mead and Company, 1977 (hardcover). Reprinted as Mallowan's Memoirs: Agatha and the Archaeologist. New York: HarperCollins, 2002 (paperback).

External links

 Agatha Christie/Sir Max Mallowan's blue plaque at Cholsey

1904 births
1978 deaths
Academics of the University of London
Archaeologists of the Near East
Alumni of New College, Oxford
Burials in Oxfordshire
English archaeologists
Commanders of the Order of the British Empire
Fellows of All Souls College, Oxford
Knights Bachelor
People educated at Lancing College
People from Wandsworth
Royal Air Force Volunteer Reserve personnel of World War II
Royal Air Force wing commanders
20th-century archaeologists